Roger Reijners (born 10 February 1964) is a Dutch football coach and former player. He is currently assistant manager of MVV Maastricht.

Playing career
Reijners turned professional with Fortuna Sittard and played in the 1–0 KNVB Cup Final defeat to Feyenoord in his first season, 1983–84. He also won four caps for the Netherlands national under-21 football team in May 1984. After becoming an Eredivisie regular, he joined MVV in early in the 1991–92 season in an exchange for Huub Driessen.

Coaching career
In 1995 Reijners retired from playing and moved on to the coaching staff at MVV. From 1995 to 2000, Reijners worked as an academy manager at MVV.

On 1 November 2010 he left his role as Fortuna Sittard manager to succeed Vera Pauw as coach of the Netherlands women's national football team.

On 20 June 2019, Reijners returned to MVV Maastricht as assistant manager of first team manager Fuat Usta.

References

1964 births
Living people
Eredivisie players
People from Roermond
Dutch footballers
Netherlands under-21 international footballers
Dutch football managers
Fortuna Sittard players
MVV Maastricht players
Netherlands women's national football team managers
2015 FIFA Women's World Cup managers
Association football midfielders
Footballers from Limburg (Netherlands)
Dutch expatriate sportspeople in Myanmar
Expatriate football managers in Myanmar
Expatriate football managers in China
Dutch expatriate sportspeople in China